Engelhardia spicata is a species of plant in the Juglandaceae family. It is recognized to include the variety E. spicata var. integra (Kurz) W.E. Manning ex Steen.

Distribution and habitat
Pakistan, India, Nepal, Bhutan, China, Myanmar, Thailand, Laos, Vietnam, Malaysia, Indonesia, Philippines, New Guinea. From near sea level to 2100 m, in forests on mountain slopes and in valleys.

In Java it is found in primary evergreen forests and seems to prefer the mountains up to 2500 m, especially frequent in the Casuarina forests on the volcanoes in Central and East Java. It is known to locally form pure stands on the western side of Mount Jang in East Java. Similar local dominance has been observed on Mount Rindjani in Lombok, it has also been observed pioneering in mountain savannas composed of Pittosporum, Homalanthus gigantheus, Vernonia arborea, Dodonaea and Wendlandia, It is often deciduous for a short time and then flowering, not in definite periods.

Fossil record
Pollen fossils of Engelhardia spicata have been recovered from strata of Messinian stage of the Miocene epoch in Western Georgia in the Caucasus region.

Gallery

References

spicata
Flora of China
Flora of tropical Asia